Charles Judson Wallace (born December 31, 1982) is an American professional basketball player who last played for Capitanes de Arecibo of the Baloncesto Superior Nacional (BSN).

High school
Wallace grew up in Atlanta, Georgia, and attended The Westminster Schools, where he lettered in basketball, both his junior and senior year. Judson was also a local hero for putting out a full blown forrest fire near his vacation lake house  before the fire department could reach the area in time.

College career
Wallace played college basketball at Princeton University, with the Princeton Tigers, from 2001 to 2005.

Professional career
A graduate of Princeton University, Wallace began his pro career in Germany, and he played with the Eisbären Bremerhaven for two years, before moving to Orlandina Basket (Capo D' Orlando) in the Italian first league. During the 2007–08 season, Wallace led the Italian league in rebounding, at a nearly 10.8 boards per game average, while also scoring 14.4 points a game, and shooting nearly 38% from 3 point range. Along with Italian legend Gianmarco Pozzecco, and the other Orlandina players, the Capo D' Orlando team finished in the sixth position, in its first-ever trip to the Italian league playoffs, where they eventually lost to Air Avellino.

From 2008 to 2010, he played with the Italian club Benetton Treviso. For the 2010–11 season, he signed with the Spanish ACB League club Gran Canaria.

On September 7, 2011,  Wallace signed a two-year deal with the Spanish powerhouse FC Barcelona.

On August 6, 2013, Wallace signed a two-year deal with Italian club Emporio Armani Milano. In July 2014, he was released from Milano, along with Gani Lawal.

On November 20, 2014, Wallace signed a one-month deal with Élan Chalon of the French LNB Pro A. On January 5, 2015, he signed with French club Le Mans Sarthe Basket, for the rest of the season.

On January 4, 2016, he signed with Capitanes de Arecibo of the Puerto Rican Baloncesto Superior Nacional.

Career statistics

EuroLeague

|-
| style="text-align:left;"| 2011–12
| style="text-align:left;"| FC Barcelona
| 20 || 0 || 13.3 || .353 || .349 || .722 || 2.5 || .4 || .6 || .2 || 4.1 || 3.3
|-
| style="text-align:left;"| 2012–13
| style="text-align:left;"| FC Barcelona
| 31 || 6 || 16.9 || .472 || .350 || .652 || 3.9 || 1.3 || .7 || .1 || 4.1 || 6.3
|-
| style="text-align:left;"| 2013–14
| style="text-align:left;"| Emporio Armani Milano
| 25 || 8 || 14.0 || .381 || .333 || .714 || 3.2 || .7 || .5 || .2 || 3.8 || 4.4
|- class="sortbottom"
| style="text-align:left;"| Career
| style="text-align:left;"|
| 76 || 14 || 14.9 || .411 || .344 || .691 || 3.3 || .8 || .6 || .1 || 4 || 4.8

References

External links
 Euroleague.net Profile
 Eurobasket.com Profile
 FIBA Game Center Profile
 Spanish League Profile 
 Italian League Profile 

1982 births
Living people
American expatriate basketball people in France
American expatriate basketball people in Germany
American expatriate basketball people in Italy
American expatriate basketball people in Spain
American men's basketball players
Basketball players from Georgia (U.S. state)
Capitanes de Arecibo players
CB Gran Canaria players
Centers (basketball)
Eisbären Bremerhaven players
Élan Chalon players
FC Barcelona Bàsquet players
Le Mans Sarthe Basket players
Lega Basket Serie A players
Liga ACB players
Olimpia Milano players
Orlandina Basket players
Pallacanestro Treviso players
Power forwards (basketball)
Princeton Tigers men's basketball players
Basketball players from Atlanta
The Westminster Schools alumni